The Modimolle–Mookgophong Local Municipality municipal council consists of twenty-eight members elected by mixed-member proportional representation. Fourteen councillors are elected by first-past-the-post voting in nine wards, while the remaining fourteen are chosen from party lists so that the total number of party representatives is proportional to the number of votes received.

Results 
The following table shows the composition of the council after past elections.

August 2016 municipal election

In the election of 3 August 2016 the African National Congress (ANC) won a plurality of thirteen seats on the council but failed to win an overall majority.  On 23 August 2016, the council subsequently elected Marlene van Staden, the mayoral candidate of the Democratic Alliance (DA), as the new mayor.

The following table shows the results of the 2016 election.

November 2021 municipal election

The following table shows the results of the 2021 election.

By-elections from November 2021
The following by-elections were held to fill vacant ward seats in the period from the election in November 2021.

References

Municipal elections in South Africa
Elections in Limpopo
Waterberg District Municipality